Doxapram hydrochloride (marketed as Dopram, Stimulex or Respiram) is a respiratory stimulant. Administered intravenously, doxapram stimulates an increase in tidal volume, and respiratory rate.

Mechanism of action

Doxapram stimulates chemoreceptors in the carotid bodies of the carotid arteries, which in turn,  stimulates the respiratory centre in the brain stem.

Appearance
Doxapram is a white to off-white, odorless, crystalline powder that is stable in light and air. It is soluble in water, sparingly soluble in alcohol and practically insoluble in ether. Injectable products have a pH from 3.5-5. Benzyl alcohol or chlorobutanol is added as a preservative agent in the commercially available injections.

Uses
Doxapram is used in intensive care settings to stimulate the respiratory rate in patients with respiratory failure. It may be useful for treating respiratory depression in patients who have taken excessive doses of drugs such as buprenorphine or fentanyl analogues which may fail to respond adequately to treatment with naloxone.

It is equally as effective as pethidine in suppressing shivering after surgery.

Doxapram has been used as an anesthetic reversal agent when taking care of captive sharks but it must be used with caution since "animals can be extremely excitatory and dangerous under the influence of this drug".

Side effects
Side effects include high blood pressure, panic attacks, rapid heart rate, tremor, sweating, and vomiting. Convulsions have been reported. Its use is relatively contraindicated in people with coronary heart disease, epilepsy, and high blood pressure. It is also contraindicated in newborns and small children, mainly due to the presence of benzyl alcohol, which is included as a preservative.

See also 
 Pentethylcyclanone (similar structure)

References 

Respiratory agents
Pyrrolidones
4-Morpholinyl compunds